The Berens River is a river in the provinces of Manitoba and Ontario, Canada. It flows west from an unnamed lake in Kenora District, Ontario, and discharges its waters into Lake Winnipeg near the community and First Nation of Berens River, Manitoba. The river has a number of lakes along its course, and many rapids.

History
The river has been a First Nations traditional hunting and fishing area for thousands of years. It was first travelled by European explorers in 1767, who descended the river to Lake Winnipeg after having crossed over from the Severn River. The river was named for Joseph Berens, then governor or the Hudson's Bay Company (HBC). Several HBC posts and one of the Northwest Company were established at the mouth, upriver, and even at the mouth of the Pigeon River further south, the first in 1814. The river system became an HBC trade route.

Natural history
Berens River is one of the last remaining fresh water rivers in southern Canada with very little development, no major roads, and with woodland caribou habitat.

Transportation
The Ontario Government announced funding in 2009 for "…design, surveying, environmental assessments and other steps required before construction can begin" for a permanent bridge on the existing winter road between the all-weather road connecting to Ontario Highway 125 to the south and the Deer Lake First Nation, North Spirit Lake First Nation and Sandy Lake First Nation to the north. The bridge would be located on the Berens River east and upstream of Berens Lake.

Settlements
Berens River, Manitoba
Poplar Hill First Nation, Ontario
Pikangikum First Nation, Ontario

Tributaries

Keeper River (left)
Crooked Mouth River (right)
Pikangikum Lake
Dowling River (left)
Throat River (right)
Windfall Creek (left)
Owl Creek (left)
Mamakwash River (left)
Whitefish River (right)
Serpent River (left)

See also  
List of rivers of Manitoba
List of rivers of Ontario

References

Rivers of Northern Manitoba
Tributaries of Hudson Bay
Rivers of Kenora District